Melukara is a small sub-village of Kozhencherry 689641 pinin Pathanamthitta district, Kerala, India. Its official languages are  Malayalam, English and Hindi.

Location
Melukara is surrounded on three sides by the Pampa River.

Climate and agriculture

The climate is humid, and the land is fertile. In addition to vegetable agriculture, farmers in Melukara cultivate coconut, mangosteen, rambutan, jackfruit, mango, nutmeg and rubber trees.

Temples
Sree Subrahmania Swami Temple is in the heart of Melukara and thiruvulsavam is being conducted every year. Chittedathu Nagachamundi Devi temple, Puthuppallil Bhagavathi Temple, A Marthoma Primary School, A Grade Vayanashala, A Marthoma church, Subrahmania swami temple, Sreekrishna swami temple, health center are a few social and religious centers in Melukara.

Snake boats
Melukara palliyodam (snakeboat) won the first prize in boat race which was conducted for the first time in Aranmula. Melukara won 7 times in mannam trophy. In 2011 the residents of Melukara made a new Snake boat "melukara palliyodam". It was built by Ayroor Chellappan Achari and his teams. In 2019 won Mannam Trophy & In 2016 Melukara Palliyodam won the first runners-up prize in the Uthrittathi Vallam kali.

Festivals
Every alternate year Sree Nagachamundi Devi Thiruvutsavam will celebrate with Bhairavi-kkolam thullal and kalamezhuthum pattum. Melukara SreeKrishna Swami Temple is owned by the Chittedathu family. The Sree Palan Pulayan Temple in Kanjeetukara is also owned by Chittedathu Family. It is a history in the world that Adiyane Poojikkunna Tambran.

References 

Villages in Pathanamthitta district